Nebula Alert is a 1967 science fiction novel by Australian author A. Bertram Chandler. The novel forms a part of the author's "Empress Irene" series of stories and was originally released as an Ace Double (G-632), backed by The Rival Rigelians by Mack Reynolds.

Plot outline
The novel features the author's minor series character the ex-Empress Irene, who has by this time abdicated her throne, and Benjamin Trafford. The husband-and-wife team crew the Imperial Yacht Wanderer and are ferrying a number of ex-slave Iralians back to their home planet. But the Wanderer runs into pirates, and they are forced to escape through the Horsehead Nebula. Space inside the nebula is strange, and they emerge into an alternate timeline where they encounter the author's major series character, John Grimes.

Critical reception
Rich Horton, on SFF.net site, found the novel rather thin: "It's all pretty silly stuff -- Chandler really never seemed to care about little things like logic. That said, it's tolerable fun in its breezy way. Nothing I'd go out of my way to find, but not a story I regret reading, either."

Notes 
The novel is the third in the author's "Empress Irene" series, preceded by Empress of Outer Space (1965) and Space Mercenaries (1965).

Dedication: "To all those excellent storytellers who, as well as affording us hours of enjoyment, have provided the inspiration for the Dream Sequence."

See also
 1967 in Australian literature

References

1967 science fiction novels
Australian science fiction novels
Ace Books books